The Caramoan Community College is a local college run by the Local Government Unit of Caramoan in the province of Camarines Sur, Philippines. It is also known by the acronym CCC or C Cube (C3). It was established in 1977, and is the first school to offer higher education in the Caramoan Peninsula.

History

Early history
The Caramoan Community College began in 1977 after the Sangguniang Bayan issued a resolution creating a higher education institution in the municipality to cater the demands of high school graduates which at that time studies at the city just to earn a college degree. The college was then housed at the Caramoan Central School grounds and classes starts at the evening. By virtue of Government Recognition (GR) No. 20, B.S.Ed. & No. 21, B.E.Ed., Series of 2004, the Commission on Higher Education Region V granted the community college to offer Bachelor of Elementary Education (BEED) and Bachelor of Secondary Education (BSED), major in English courses effective since Academic Year 2004–2005.

Recent history

On November 21, 2014, the college building was inaugurated at Cadong, Caramoan, Camarines Sur. Since then, it underwent major changes in its college administration. It also started to open classes at morning and afternoon. After the long stay of Dr. Santelices as College Administrator, she was replaced by then BISCAST Professor Dr. Rolando D. Marcaida. Mr. Romeo M. Borja also assumed as the new College Registrar after his retirement at the same state college. Just recently, as the new administration of the municipality started to implement various changes in the college's administration, newly elected Municipal Mayor and chairman of the Board of Trustees Hon. Marilyn Socorro H. Co installed former college instructor and retired Caramoan Central School Principal II Mrs. Ma. Lorna B. Sy as the new College Administrator. Her appointment as the new college head also paved the way for representatives from the Commission on Higher Education in Metro Manila to visit the college and assess the performance of the higher educational institution last August 2019. The college also now offers Bachelor of Arts in Political Science (AB PolSci) and soon to open a graduate school program.

Administration

Board of trustees

Administrative officials

Academics

Undergraduate programs
College of Education
 Bachelor of Elementary Education (BEED)
 Bachelor of Secondary Education (BSED), major in English
College of Arts and Sciences
 Bachelor of Arts in Political Science (AB PolSci)

College seal

The college seal is circular in shape containing the name Caramoan Community College. On the lower portion of the circle is the location of the college Caramoan Camarines Sur. Superimposed on the U shape figure are the six rays which symbolize the dedication and the purpose towards the pursuit of Knowledge, Wisdom and Truth in the service to God, Country, and People, with the torch at the center symbolizing education. The blue and gold stripes, which hereof embody the college continuing search for excellence in all spheres of educational endeavors, are the official colors of the college.

References
 
Guidebook for College Students (Second Edition), Caramoan Community College, Caramoan, Camarines Sur

Universities and colleges in Camarines Sur
Local colleges and universities in the Philippines
Educational institutions established in 1977